Štefanová is a village and municipality in western Slovakia in  Pezinok District in the Bratislava region.

See also
 List of municipalities and towns in Slovakia

References

External links

 Official page

Villages and municipalities in Pezinok District